Omari Idd Kimweri (born 22 September 1982) is a Tanzanian-Australian professional boxer who challenged for the WBC strawweight title in 2017. As an amateur he represented Tanzania in the 2006 Commonwealth Games.

Professional career
Kimweri has most commonly fought at light-flyweight and flyweight, fighting for and winning several regional titles. He defeated Randy Petalcorin by split decision to win the WBC Silver flyweight title in April 2016, earning a WBC world title opportunity. He opted to drop weight class to strawweight and challenged WBC champion Wanheng Menayothin in June 2017, but lost by unanimous decision.

Professional boxing record

{|class="wikitable" style="text-align:center"
|-
!
!Result
!Record
!Opponent
!Type
!Round, time
!Date
!Location
!Notes
|-
|22
|Loss
|17–5
|style="text-align:left;"|Tibo Monabesa
|UD
|12
|7 Jul 2019
|style="text-align:left;"|
|style="text-align:left;"|
|-
|21
|Win
|17–4
|style="text-align:left;"|Suphakit Khampha
|TKO
|1 (6), 
|14 Dec 2018
|style="text-align:left;"|
|
|-
|20
|Loss
|16–4
|style="text-align:left;"|Wanheng Menayothin
|UD
|12
|3 Jun 2017
|style="text-align:left;"|
|style="text-align:left;"|
|-
|19
|Win
|16–3
|style="text-align:left;"|Randy Petalcorin
|SD
|12
|15 Apr 2016
|style="text-align:left;"|
|style="text-align:left;"|
|-
|18
|Win
|15–3
|style="text-align:left;"|Michael Camelion
|UD
|10
|26 Feb 2016
|style="text-align:left;"|
|style="text-align:left;"|
|-
|17
|Win
|14–3
|style="text-align:left;"|Pakpoom Hammarach
|KO
|2 (4), 
|5 Jun 2015
|style="text-align:left;"|
|
|-
|16
|Win
|13–3
|style="text-align:left;"|Unknown
|TKO
|1 (4), 
|25 Jul 2013
|style="text-align:left;"|
|
|-
|15
|Loss
|12–3
|style="text-align:left;"|Shin Ono
|SD
|12
|12 Jan 2013
|style="text-align:left;"|
|style="text-align:left;"|
|-
|14
|Win
|12–2
|style="text-align:left;"|Yodpichai Sithsaithong
|UD
|6
|13 Jul 2012
|style="text-align:left;"|
|
|-
|13
|Win
|11–2
|style="text-align:left;"|Lookrak Kiatmungmee
|UD
|8
|2 Dec 2011
|style="text-align:left;"|
|
|-
|12
|Win
|10–2
|style="text-align:left;"|Junior Bajawa
|UD
|4
|5 Aug 2011
|style="text-align:left;"|
|
|-
|11
|Win
|9–2
|style="text-align:left;"|Panmongkol Ekarin
|TKO
|2 (12), 
|8 Apr 2011
|style="text-align:left;"|
|style="text-align:left;"|
|-
|10
|Win
|8–2
|style="text-align:left;"|Jack Amisa
|UD
|6
|27 Nov 2010
|style="text-align:left;"|
|
|-
|9
|Win
|7–2
|style="text-align:left;"|Ricky Manufoe
|SD
|6
|20 Aug 2010
|style="text-align:left;"|
|
|-
|8
|Win
|6–2
|style="text-align:left;"|Matt Meredith
|TKO
|1 (10), 
|27 Feb 2010
|style="text-align:left;"|
|style="text-align:left;"|
|-
|7
|Win
|5–2
|style="text-align:left;"|Thanupetch Singmanasak
|UD
|6
|22 May 2009
|style="text-align:left;"|
|
|-
|6
|Win
|4–2
|style="text-align:left;"|Chiya Sithkrupon
|KO
|2 (4), 
|20 Mar 2009
|style="text-align:left;"|
|
|-
|5
|Win
|3–2
|style="text-align:left;"|Roberto Lerio
|
|8
|1 Nov 2008
|style="text-align:left;"|
|
|-
|4
|Loss
|2–2
|style="text-align:left;"|Angky Angkotta
|UD
|12
|24 Jun 2008
|style="text-align:left;"|
|style="text-align:left;"|
|-
|3
|Win
|2–1
|style="text-align:left;"|Shane Brock
|
|6 (6), 
|28 Mar 2008
|style="text-align:left;"|
|
|-
|2
|Loss
|1–1
|style="text-align:left;"|Ernie Gonzales, Jr.
|
|1 (6), 
|30 Nov 2007
|style="text-align:left;"|
|
|-
|1
|Win
|1–0
|style="text-align:left;"|Emanuel Micallef
|
|4
|20 Jul 2007
|style="text-align:left;"|
|

External links
 

1982 births
Living people
Tanzanian male boxers
People from Dar es Salaam
Boxers at the 2006 Commonwealth Games
Commonwealth Games competitors for Tanzania
Australian male boxers
Flyweight boxers